Sukhanand Dham or Sukhanand ji  is located at a distance of about  from the city of Jawad, which is more of an ancient rock-cave that is located on the border of the Rajasthan State. This ashram is said to be built by the son of Vedavyasa, known by the name of Suka, Sukadev, Sri Suka and Brahmarata. This ashram also consists of a temple dedicated to Lord Shiva and it is wholly surrounded by the mountains and a waterfall and Sukhanand Sagar Dam nearby.

History 
"Shree Sukhanand" the name is on the name of an old saint. Sree Sukhanand ji was an saint in old time who was living in the place where now a temple of God Shiva is situated with shivaling near by that one small temple of shree Sukhanand is situated in Jawad tehsil of Neemuch district Madhya pradesh.

Major occasion 
Sukhanand is considered to be a holy place. It also becomes a major point of attraction for tourist in Neemuch area and its subsidiary local villages. It is considered as mostly crowded on Hariyali Amavasya comes in rainy season where the thing like Fair is organised by the local authorities.

References

External links 
Sukhanan Dham at tripadvisor.com

Ashrams
Caves of Madhya Pradesh
Shiva temples in Madhya Pradesh